The All-Ireland Senior B Hurling Championship of 1996 was the 23rd staging of Ireland's secondary hurling knock-out competition.  Derry won the championship, beating Wicklow 1-14 to 0-10 in the final at Croke Park, Dublin.

References

 Donegan, Des, The Complete Handbook of Gaelic Games (DBA Publications Limited, 2005).

1996
Hur
B